Håkon Skogseid (born 14 January 1988) is a Norwegian former footballer who played as a right back.

He signed for Viking FK in January 2009, after having previously played for Stabæk and Notodden FK. Skogseid also played for the Norwegian U21 team.

Career statistics

References

1988 births
Living people
Sportspeople from Bærum
Association football defenders
Norwegian footballers
Stabæk Fotball players
Notodden FK players
Viking FK players
Odense Boldklub players
Lillestrøm SK players
Norwegian First Division players
Eliteserien players
Danish Superliga players
Norwegian expatriate footballers
Norwegian expatriate sportspeople in Denmark
Expatriate men's footballers in Denmark